Marcus Rafael Nikkanen (26 January 1904 – 28 March 1985) was a Finnish figure skater. He was the 1930 European bronze medalist and the 1933 World bronze medalist. He represented Finland at the 1928 Winter Olympics, at the 1932 Winter Olympics, and the 1936 Winter Olympics. He placed sixth in 1928,  fourth in 1932, and  seventh in 1936.

He was born and died in Helsinki.

Results

References

1904 births
1985 deaths
Sportspeople from Helsinki
People from Uusimaa Province (Grand Duchy of Finland)
Finnish male single skaters
Olympic figure skaters of Finland
Figure skaters at the 1928 Winter Olympics
Figure skaters at the 1932 Winter Olympics
Figure skaters at the 1936 Winter Olympics
World Figure Skating Championships medalists
European Figure Skating Championships medalists